Lettie Beckon Alston (born 1953) is an American composer known for her piano work and a longstanding series of concerts, "Lettie Alston and Friends."

Biography 
Alston was born in 1953 in Detroit.

Alston attended Wayne State University for her undergraduate and masters degrees. In 1983, she earned her doctorate in musical composition from the University of Michigan (UM) where she had studied with Leslie Bassett, William Bolcom and Eugene Kurtz. She was the first African-American to earn this degree from UM.

Work 
Alston's work includes traditional, as well as electronic instruments. She has composed for orchestra, chamber and vocal groups.

In 1995, Alston started a series of concerts at Oakland University called, "Lettie Alston and Friends." The concerts featured contemporary classical music usually based around a central theme. The last of these concerts took place in 2008.

In 2001, her work was recorded on a two CD set, Keyboard Maniac.  The set highlighted both her work on acoustic and electric piano. She passed away in 2014 while vacationing in Hawaii.

References

External links 
Rhapsody No. 4, "Keyboard Maniac"

1953 births
Musicians from Detroit
Wayne State University alumni
University of Michigan alumni
African-American composers
African-American women composers
American women composers
Living people
African-American women musicians
21st-century African-American people
20th-century African-American people
20th-century African-American women
21st-century African-American women